El Doncello is a town and municipality in Caquetá Department, Colombia with a population, according to a 2018 census, of 17,775. There is evidence that it was first settled in the 1930s, but most large-scale official building occurred from the 1950s onwards. The immigrant families that first settled El Doncello came from various neighbouring regions and were mainly avoiding the monopolization of land in the country's centre; the colonization was more or less spontaneous, as there was no institution overseeing the process.

References

Municipalities of Caquetá Department